Kaplinsky or Kaplinski is a Polish surname of Jewish origin. The surname is derived from the Polish word kaplan which became vernacular equivalent of the word Kohen, which, in turn, is a Hebrew word for priest. Notable people with the surname include:

Alan Kaplinsky (born 1945), American jurist and lawyer
 (1901-1943), Estonian philologist, father of Jaan Kaplinski
Jaan Kaplinski (1941–2021), Estonian poet, philosopher, and culture critic
Leon Kaplinski (1824–1873), Polish painter and political activist
Moshe Kaplinsky (born 1957), Israeli general
Natasha Kaplinsky (born 1972), English newsreader
Raphael Kaplinsky (born 1946), American academic, father of Natasha Kaplinsky
Yoheved Kaplinsky (born 1947), Israeli-American pianist and pedagogue

See also 
 Cohen (surname)
 Kaminsky (surname)
 Kapłański (surname)
 29528 Kaplinski

References 
Kohenitic surnames

Jewish surnames
Polish-language surnames
Surnames